Irgali (Dargwa: Иргъалимахьи) is a rural locality (a selo) in Kuppinsky Selsoviet, Levashinsky District, Republic of Dagestan, Russia. The population was 206 as of 2010.

Geography 
It is located 15 km west of Levashi.

Nationalities 
Dargins live there.

References 

Rural localities in Levashinsky District